El Lucero. Diario político, literario y mercantil was an Argentine newspaper of the 19th century, edited during the governments of Lavalle, Viamonte, Rosas and Balcarce.

History 

El Lucero, was a newspaper whose content was based on politics, literature and business news, founded by Neapolitan journalist Pedro de Ángelis. It was published in the Imprenta Argentina and Imprenta de la Independencia, between September 7, 1829 and July 31, 1833.

Gallery

References 

Defunct newspapers published in Argentina
Newspapers established in 1829
Publications disestablished in 1833
Río de la Plata
1829 establishments in Argentina
1833 disestablishments in Argentina